Susan Lynn Schneider is an American academic and public philosopher. She is the founding director of the Center for the Future Mind at Florida Atlantic University where she also holds the William F. Dietrich Distinguished Professorship.
Schneider has also held the Baruch S. Blumberg NASA/Library of Congress Chair in Astrobiology, Exploration, and Scientific Innovation at NASA and the Distinguished Scholar Chair at the Library of Congress.

Education 
Schneider graduated from University of California, Berkeley in 1993 with a B.A. (honors) in Economics. She then went to Rutgers University where she worked with Jerry Fodor,  graduating with a Ph.D. in Philosophy in 2003.

Career
Schneider taught at Moravian College as an assistant professor of philosophy from 2003–2006. She was an assistant professor of philosophy at the University of Pennsylvania from 2006-2012. 
She became an associate professor of philosophy and cognitive science at the University of Connecticut in 2012 where she was the founding director of the group for AI, Mind and Society ("AIMS"). In addition she has done research at the Australian National University (2013), the Institute for Advanced Study in Princeton, New Jersey (2016-2017) and at the Yale Interdisciplinary Center for Bioethics at Yale University (2015-2019)

At the Library of Congress in Washington, D.C. she has held the Distinguished Scholar chair (January–June 2019) and the Baruch S. Blumburg NASA Chair in Astrobiology, Exploration and Technological innovation (October 2019-). In 2020, Schneider accepted the position of William F. Dietrich Professor of Philosophy at Florida Atlantic University (FAU), jointly appointed to the FAU Brain Institute.

Philosophy of mind
Schneider writes about the philosophical nature of the mind and self, drawing on and addressing issues from  philosophy of mind, cognitive science, artificial intelligence, ethics, metaphysics, and astrobiology. Topics include the nature of life, the nature of persons, what minds have in common with programs, radical brain enhancement,  superintelligence, panpsychism, and emergent spacetime.

Artificial Intelligence
In her book Artificial You: AI and the Future of Your Mind, Schneider discusses different theories of artificial intelligence (AI) and consciousness, and speculates about the ethical, philosophical, and scientific implications of AI for humanity. She argues that AI will inevitably change our understanding of intelligence, and may also change us in ways that we do not anticipate, intend, or desire. She advocates for a cautious and thoughtful approach to transhumanism. She emphasizes that people must make careful choices to ensure that sentient beings - whether human or android - flourish. Using AI technology to reshape the human brain or to build machine minds, will mean experimenting with "tools" that we do not understand how to use: the mind, the self, and consciousness. Schneider argues that failing to understand fundamental philosophical issues will jeopardize the beneficial use of AI and brain enhancement technology, and may lead to the suffering or death of conscious beings. To flourish, humans must address the philosophical issues underlying  the AI algorithms.

In her work on the mind-body problem, she argues against physicalism, maintaining a monistic position and offering, in a series of papers, several novel anti-physicalist arguments.

In the domain of astrobiology, Schneider contends that the most intelligent alien beings we encounter will be "postbiological in nature", being forms of artificial intelligence, that they would be superintelligent, and that we can predict what the shape of some of these superintelligences would be like. Her reason for the claim that the most intelligent aliens will be "postbiological" is called the "short window observation." The short-window supposition holds that by the time any society learns to transmit radio signals, they're likely just a few hundred years from upgrading their own biology.

In an earlier technical book on the computational nature of the brain with MIT Press, The Language of Thought: a New Philosophical Direction (2011), Schneider examines the viability of different computational theories of thinking. Expanding on the work of Jerry Fodor, with whom she had studied, she suggests revisions to the symbol processing approach known as the "language of thought hypothesis" (LOTH) or "language of thought" (LOT). Drawing on both computational neuroscience and  cognitive psychology, Scheider argues that the brain may be a hybrid computational system. She defends a view in which mental symbols are the basic vocabulary items composing the language of thought. She then uses this conception of symbols, together with certain work on the nature of meaning, to construct a theory of the nature of concepts. The basic theory of concepts is intended to be ecumenical, having a version that applies in the case of connectionism, as well as versions that apply to both the prototype theory and definitions view of concepts.

Public philosophy
Schneider is active as a public philosopher, who believes that individuals, not companies, need to be considering and deciding the philosophical issues that will affect them  personally, socially, and culturally as a result of artificial intelligence. She writes opinion pieces for venues such as the New York Times,
The Financial Times
and Scientific American.

Her work has been mentioned by numerous publications including 
The New York Times, Wired Magazine, Smithsonian, Discover Magazine, Science Magazine, Slate, 
Motherboard, 
Big Think, 
Inverse, and 
Nautilus.

Schneider has been featured on television shows on BBC World News, 
The History Channel, Fox News, PBS, and the National Geographic Channel, and appears in the feature film, Supersapiens: the Rise of the Mind by Markus Mooslechner.

 Books 
 (with Max Velmans, eds.), The Blackwell Companion to Consciousness,  Oxford: Blackwell Publishers, 2006. 
 Science Fiction and Philosophy, Oxford: Wiley-Blackwell, 2009. 
 The Language of Thought: a New Philosophical Direction, MIT Press, 2011. 
 Artificial You: AI and the Future of Your Mind'', Princeton University Press, 2019.

References

External links 
Susan Schneider's Website
BBC World News Segment on Schneider
Schneider on Big Think

University of Connecticut faculty
American philosophers
American cognitive scientists
Artificial intelligence researchers
Florida Atlantic University faculty
Year of birth missing (living people)
Living people
Rutgers University alumni
University of California, Berkeley alumni
Moravian University faculty
University of Pennsylvania faculty
American women philosophers